Thierry Bernard-Gotteland (born 1974) is a French artist. He lives and works among France and Vietnam.

Biography 
TBG was born in Chambéry, Savoie. He studied at Willem de Kooning Academy in Rotterdam (NL) and he graduated with a MFA from the Ecole des Beaux-Arts, Grenoble, France. He went to Le Fresnoy, National Studio of Contemporary Arts in Tourcoing, enrolled in a post-diploma program. He was an artist assistant for Gianni Motti and for Antoni Muntadas, 2002 – 2006.

Scholarships 
 2001: Willem de Kooning, Rotterdam (NL)
 2002–2004: Le Fresnoy, National French Studio of Contemporary Arts, Tourcoing (F)

Events

Solo exhibitions 
2017 :
 Echoing Scars, Galerie Quynh, Ho Chi Minh City, Vietnam (http://galeriequynh.com/exhibition/echoing-scars/)
 2011 :
 A Physical Obedience of a Certain Geometry [Nihil Sublime], Galerie Quynh, Ho Chi Minh City, Vietnam
 2008 :
 D.E.A.F. D.E.C.A.D.E,"The Month of Images Festival" organized by the French Embassy, San Art Gallery, Ho Chi Minh City, Vietnam
 2007 :
 Entre Chien et Loup, IDECAF Cultural Franco-Vietnamese Center, Ho Chi Minh City, Vietnam
 2005 :
 R.D.V., La Maison du Geste et de l'Image, Paris, France

Group shows 
2016 :
 TechNoPhobe, The Factory Contemporary Arts Centre, Ho Chi Minh City, Vietnam
2014 :
 Being Present, Galerie Quynh, Ho Chi Minh City, Vietnam
 Onward and Upward, Galerie Quynh, Ho Chi Minh City, Vietnam 
 2011 :
 Fete dela WSK!, Sonic Art Festival, Manila, The Philippines "MOETH" live performance by Thierry Bernard-Gotteland & Mohamad Wahid
 Esperanto Polis, Ho Chi Minh City, Vietnam
 To Ho Chi Minh City with Love: A Social Sculpture, an art project by Phong Bui, San Art Gallery, Ho Chi Minh City, Vietnam
 Mise-en-Scène, Galerie Quynh, Ho Chi Minh City, Vietnam
 2008 :
 Archigames, Territoire de l’Image, Le Fresnoy, 10 ans de création, Lab – La banque, Bethune, France
 2007 :
 Alpine Random Stereo World, Filmer La Musique, Le Point Ephémère, Paris, France
 ZurichBangkokSaigon, Des Monts de la Lune, la Nuit Blanche, Paris, France
 2005 :
 Sound Drop, La Nuit Blanche, La Goutte d’Or, Paris, France
 Itinéraires Privés, Galerie Espace Croisé CAC Roubaix, France
 Festival 1° Contact, Biennale of Digital Arts, Le Cube – Issy les Moulineaux, France
 2004 :
 Blobmeister Millennium Bash, Panorama 5, Le Fresnoy – National Studio of Contemporary Arts, Tourcoing, France
 2003 :
 Archigames, Panorama 4, Le Fresnoy – National Studio of Contemporary Arts, Tourcoing, France
 2002 :
 Predator 360W, Label Noiseuse, La BF15 Gallery, Lyon, France
 2001 :
 Film Festival Berlin – Circle of Confusion, Berlin, Germany
 Playground, Galerie SMM Gianni Motti, Berlin, Germany

Performances 
2017
 Live Acoustic Guitar and Vocals (Sad Love Songs in Pop/Ska/Punk Rock) @ Ruby Soho Bar - Phu My Hung, Ho Chi Minh City, Vietnam
2015:
 Icarus Festival, Atavism Electronic Music Production, Mui Ne, Vietnam
 Kaleidosoup, LMP First VJ International Meeting, Ho Chi Minh City, Vietnam
2013:
 Zero Station, Live Noise Performance Ho Chi Minh City, Vietnam
2012
 Atavism Electronic AUdio & Visual Live Performances Ho Chi Minh City, Vietnam
 MOETH Live Performance Vietnam
2011:
 MOETH, live concert-performance Drone – Doom, Hanoi RockCity, Hanoi, Vietnam
2010:
 NTSD Project, sound & visual noise performance, Upstairs Club, Ho Chi Minh City, Vietnam
 2008 :
 D.E.A.F. D.E.C.A.D.E., sound performance [Drone Metal] with Nguyen Tien Hung, lead vocal of Black Infinity, Metal Band, Ho Chi Minh City, Vietnam
 Untitled [Delayed Dust Screens], sound performance at The Cage, LABO WONDERFUL, Ho Chi Minh City, Vietnam
 2005 :
 Alien Terri-Stories, sound performance, LMP, Paris, La Goutte d'Or – Nuit Blanche, France
 WJ'S, web performance, Baubourg, Paris, France
 2003 :
 PlayStation versus Csound with Alex Geddie, Confort Moderne Poitiers, France
 BugN'Mix, CNAC, le Magasin, Grenoble
 2001 :
 Miroirs Numériques, concert‐performance Festival 38° Rugissants, Grenoble, France
 2000 :
 Sound Improvisation, concert‐performance, le 102, Grenoble, France

Bibliography 
 2016 Online Magazine " Bauer, Alice, Thierry Bernard-Gotteland, www.altescplatform.com, July 2016 (http://www.altescplatform.com/vol2#/thierry/) »
 2014 Newspapers " DU LÊ, When foreigners play music in Vietnam, THE THAO & VAN HOA CUOI TUAN, Issue No : 35, Vietnam (http://enews.andi.vn/NewsDetail.aspx?3726193.200028982) "
 2013 Newspapers " My Tran, Invisible Lines tour comes to city, The Saigon Times, March 7, 2013, Ho Chi Minh City, Vietnam "
 2011 Newspapers " To Van Nga, Heavy metal art, Thanh Nien News, August 12, 2011, Ho Chi Minh City, Vietnam " 
 2011 Newspapers " My Tran, Mythologies of heavy metal at Galerie Quynh, The Saigon Times, July 6, 2011, Ho Chi Minh City, Vietnam "
 Exhibition's Catalogue " Le mois de l'Image, The Fabricated Image »
 Exhibition's Catalogue " Festival 1° Contact, Biennale of Digital Arts »
 Exhibition's Catalogue " Territoire de l'Image, Le Fresnoy, 10 ans de création »
 Exhibition's Catalogue " Panorama 5 – Jamais Vu »
 Exhibition's Catalogue " Panorama 4 – Paysage Persistent »
 Magazine " Archistorm#13 " may-June 2005

External links 
 http://bernard-gotteland.wix.com/thierry
 https://web.archive.org/web/20111009032856/http://www.vietnewsonline.vn/News/Lifestyle/7122/Music-inspired-by-Vietnams-traffic.htm?mode=PrintView
 http://www.mu.asso.fr
 http://lecube.com/coproductions/blobmeister-millennium-bash-thierry-bernard---gotteland
 http://galeriequynh.com/exhibition/echoing-scars/

1974 births
Living people
French installation artists
French contemporary artists
People from Chambéry
Willem de Kooning Academy alumni